Sacundin Ben Samba is the third album by Brazilian singer-songwriter and guitarist Jorge Ben, released in 1964.

Music and lyrics 
The album is stylistically very similar to Ben's debut Samba Esquema Novo, although the rhetoric of protest music, inspired by the likes of João de Vale and Zé Keti and found in such songs as "Não desanima João", "Jeitão de preto velho", and "A princesa e o plebeu" sets it apart from its predecessors.

Critical reception 

Along with Ben's first two records, Sacundin Ben Samba was described by Will Hermes as the "blueprint for much of modern Brazilian pop." Music critic Rodney Taylor, who was critical of the previous album, said Ben "rights himself ... with the bigger band arrangements fleshing out his sound rather than drowning it."

Track listing
All tracks written by Jorge Ben, except where noted

 "Anjo Azul" – 2:48
 "Nena Nana" – 2:52
 "Vamos Embora "Uau"" - 2:32
 "Capoeira" - 2:48
 "Gimbo" - 2:35
 "Carnaval Triste" (Paulo Bruce, Sérgio C. de Almeida) - 2:33
 "A Princesa e o Plebeu" - 3:25
 "Menina do Vestido Coral" - 3:31
 "Pula Baú" - 2:28
 "Jeitão de Preto Velho" - 3:04
 "Espero por Você" (João Mello) - 2:04
 "Não Desanima João" - 3:14

Personnel
Jorge Ben –  vocals, violão
Luís Carlos Vinhas - piano, arrangements
Manuel Gusmão – bass
Pedro Paulo – trumpet
Dom Um Romão – drums

References

External links 
 

1964 albums
Jorge Ben albums
Philips Records albums
Portuguese-language albums